Complete Treatise on Agriculture, or Complete Book of Agricultural Management,  or Encyclopaedia of Agriculture,  is a compilation of the scientific studies of agriculture written by Xu Guangqi. The book was composed from 1625 to 1628 and published in 1639,  totalling 700,000 words.

Complete Treatise on Agriculture summarises many of the agricultural experiences and techniques of the ancient Chinese working people, citing over 300 kinds of ancient works and documents.

References

1639 books
17th-century books
Ming dynasty literature
Agriculture books